Norman Francis Bates (November 6, 1839 - October 16, 1915) was an American soldier who received the Medal of Honor for valor during the American Civil War.

Biography
Bates served in the American Civil War in the 4th Iowa Cavalry for the Union Army. He received the Medal of Honor on June 17, 1865 for his actions at Columbus, Georgia.

Medal of Honor citation
Citation:

Capture of flag and bearer

See also

List of American Civil War Medal of Honor recipients: A–F

References

External links

Military Times
Iowa Medal of Honor Heroes

1839 births
1915 deaths
Union Army soldiers
United States Army Medal of Honor recipients
People of Vermont in the American Civil War
American Civil War recipients of the Medal of Honor
Burials at Forest Lawn Memorial Park (Glendale)
People from Londonderry, Vermont